Birmingham Orthodox Friends Meeting, also known as the Birmingham Orthodox Meeting House, is a historic Quaker meetinghouse in Birmingham Township, Chester County, Pennsylvania that was built in 1845 as a result of the Hicksite-Orthodox split in the Society of Friends.  The members of the Birmingham Friends Meetinghouse, a few hundred yards north, joined the Hicksite branch of the Quaker movement, as was common among farmers in Chester and Delaware Counties.  That meetinghouse was the site of fighting during the Battle of Brandywine in 1777, and is listed separately on the National Register of Historic Places.

The Birmingham Orthodox Friends Meetinghouse was built in a more modern or "classical" style, with larger windows than the older meetinghouse.  It was built at a total cost of $2,310.83 from green serpentine stone quarried at Chalkley Bell's Quarries in Westtown Township. It seated up to 200 people. A small graveyard was also built in 1874.

The two meetinghouses rejoined in 1923, well before the overall split healed in 1955, and the Orthodox Meetinghouse was sold in 1938 for use as a private residence.

It was added to the National Register of Historic Places in 1972.

References

Churches on the National Register of Historic Places in Pennsylvania
Churches completed in 1845
19th-century Quaker meeting houses
Churches in Chester County, Pennsylvania
Quaker meeting houses in Pennsylvania
National Register of Historic Places in Chester County, Pennsylvania